Arabesque Records is an American record company and label specializing in jazz and classical music.

It was founded by Caedmon Audio as a classical music label. In 1988 it was bought by Ward Botsford and Marvin Reiss, becoming an independent label, and in 1992 added jazz to its production, with early releases by Craig Handy and Carmen Lundy. Its catalogue grew to include  Jane Ira Bloom, Thomas Chapin, Dave Douglas, Art Farmer, Billy Hart, Myra Melford, and Charles McPherson, and Horace Tapscott.

Discography

Jazz

Classical (early issues)
 Schubert and Schnabel – An Historical Recording, Volume IV., Therese Behr (1987)
 Ralph Vaughan Williams - Sir Yehudi Menuhin Conducting the English Chamber Orchestra (1988)
 The Complete Chopin Piano Works – Garrick Ohlsson, piano (1989)
 Music of Alkan – Ronald Smith, piano (1985)
 The Complete Piano Variations of Johannes Brahms – Ian Hobson, piano (1994)
 George Gershwin: An American in Paris, Rhapsody in Blue, Concerto in F – London Symphony Orchestra, Mitch Miller, conductor, David Golub, piano (1992)
 Mozart: Complete Works for Four Hands – Artur Balsam & Gena Raps, piano (1995)
 Richard Strauss: Sinfonia Domestica; 4 Orchestral Songs – Wilhelm Furtwängler, Berlin Philharmonic Orchestra (1989)
 Benjamin Britten: Illuminations; Variations on a Theme of Frank Bridge; Simple Symphony - English Chamber Orchestra; Elisabeth Söderström, Soprano; Gilbert Levine, Conductor (1989)
 Dmitri Shostakovitch: Symphony No. 1; Piano Concerto; Age of Gold Suite - Cracow Philharmonic Orchestra; Garrick Ohlsson, Piano; Gilbert Levine, Conductor (1989)

Classical (later issues)
 Encore Rossini, Rockwell Blake
 Inner Cities (2003), Alvin Curran, Bruce Brubaker, piano
Chopin: 24 Etudes, op.10 and op.25, Matthew Cameron, piano (2015)
 Schumann: Liederkreis (Kerner Lieder; Lenau Lieder and Requiem; Eichendorff Liederkreis), Sergey Schepkin with Darren Chase, baritone (2013)
 Quynh Nguyen plays Schubert, Chopin (2004)
 Matthew Cameron plays Romantic Favorites for Piano (2012)
 Forgotten Americans Z6823, includes: "A Life," Ernst Bacon, Joel Krosnick, cello and Gilbert Kalish, piano.
 La fedeltà premiata, Haydn, Z6751-3 (1999)
 Schumann: Song Cycles Op. 24, 42 & 48 – Leon Fleisher, Phyllis Bryn-Julson, John Shirly-Quirk (2009)
 Franz Schubert: String Quartets – Guarneri String Quartet, (2009)

See also

List of Record Labels

References

Further reading
 S. Gribetz, "Label Watch: Arabesque's Dual Personality". Jazz Times vol. 22, no. 9 (1992), p. 24.

External links
 Arabesque Records website

New York (state) record labels
Jazz record labels